"Venus in Blue Jeans" is a 1962 song written by Howard Greenfield and Jack Keller.

The song was also recorded that year by Mark Wynter who released the song in the UK where it reached No. 4.

Background
The song was written by Howard Greenfield and Jack Keller, although Neil Sedaka is often miscredited as one of the writers. Greenfield took inspiration in the lyrics from songs such as "Mona Lisa" by Nat King Cole and "Venus" by Frankie Avalon. A demo was then recorded with Barry Mann on lead vocals and The Cookies on backing vocals. The song was first recorded by Bruce Bruno in 1961 and released as the B-side to a single titled "Dear Joanne" on Roulette Records, but the single failed to chart. 

In 1962, Jimmy Clanton went to New York after pausing his career to serve with the National Guard, and got in touch with Greenfield and Sedaka to record some songs.  He found "Venus in Blue Jeans" in a pile of rejected demos and liked the chord changes of the opening bars, although Greenfield dismissed the song as it had been rejected by other artists.  Clanton, however, failed to find other suitable songs, and so he chose to record "Venus in Blue Jeans" as a throwaway song. Carole King arranged the brass and strings in the song, and was responsible for the distinctive horn section of the opening of the song. Gerry Goffin arranged the muted trumpet in the middle eight. Keller produced the song. 

The song was originally listed as the "B" side to the record with "Highway Bound" listed as the "A" side. Radio disc jockeys preferred the "B" side and it became a hit. The pressings of the single listed in error Sedaka as a writer together with Greenfield.

Charts

Mark Wynter version 

Mark Wynter recorded a version soon after Clanton's version was released. The song was produced by Tony Hatch who directed the arrangement, and released on Pye Records. His release succeeded in reaching  on the UK chart, and became his highest charting song in the UK.

Charts

Other versions
Claude François released a French version titled "Vénus en blue-jeans", which reached No. 5 in the Walloon chart in Belgium in 1963.

References 

1962 singles
Jimmy Clanton songs
Songs with lyrics by Howard Greenfield
Songs written by Jack Keller (songwriter)
1962 songs